Sir Alexander Knox Helm  (23 March 1893 – 7 March 1964) was a British diplomat who served as ambassador to Turkey and was the last Governor-General of the Sudan.

Early years
Born to W. H. Helm of Dumfries, Alexander Knox Helm was educated at Dumfries Academy and King's College, Cambridge.

Career
In 1912, he passed the examination for what was then called second division clerkships and was appointed to the Foreign Office. He served as a member of the East Registry. A keen volunteer when World War I broke out, he was allowed by the Foreign Office to join his field artillery unit, being promoted second lieutenant in 1917 and serving in that capacity in Palestine. As a clerk, he performed only routine duties but distinguished himself through his diligence and retentive memory.

When the war ended, he was selected under the special recruitment scheme for filling vacancies caused by the war and appointed to the Levant Consular Service. After a short period of training in Oriental languages at King's College, Cambridge, he went as Vice-Consul to Thessaloniki, and soon after became third Dragoman at Constantinople. When the Turkish capital moved to Ankara and the office of Dragoman was abolished, Helm went there as Second Secretary. He served there as Consul, and in 1930 was transferred to the Foreign Office, working in the Eastern Department.

In 1937 he was sent as Consul to Addis Ababa, and at the outbreak of World War II was moved to the British Embassy at Washington, D.C., where he handled the various complicated problems connected with the supply of petroleum to the United Kingdom. In 1942 he went back to Ankara (at that moment a key post) as Counsellor.

In 1946 he was chosen to go as British representative to Hungary and when normal diplomatic relations were restored in 1947 he was made Minister there. In 1949 he was appointed the first British Chargé d'Affaires (later Minister) to Tel Aviv in the newly independent State of Israel, where he spent two happy and fruitful years; in 1951 he became Ambassador to Turkey. He left there in 1954, having reached retirement age, but went for a brief period to Khartoum in 1955, being the last Governor-General there.

Publications
The Middle East of to-day and its problems (Ramsay Muir memorial lecture delivered at Cambridge on 5 August 1956), Ramsay Muir Educational Trust, Purley, 1956

Spouses
His first wife, Grace Little, died in 1925. His second, Isabel Marsh, whom he married in 1931, survived him after he died at sea in 1964.

References

HELM, Sir (Alexander) Knox, Who Was Who, A & C Black, 1920–2008; online edn, Oxford University Press, Dec 2012, accessed 11 April 2013
Sir Knox Helm: Brilliant Career In Diplomacy (obituary), The Times, London, 10 March 1964, page 16
Sir Knox Helm: A friend writes ..., The Times, London, 16 March 1964, page 12

1893 births
1964 deaths
Royal Artillery officers
British Army personnel of World War I
Governors-General of Anglo-Egyptian Sudan
Knights Grand Cross of the Order of the British Empire
Knights Commander of the Order of St Michael and St George
People who died at sea
Ambassadors of the United Kingdom to Turkey
People from Dumfries
People educated at Dumfries Academy
Alumni of King's College, Cambridge
Ambassadors of the United Kingdom to Hungary
Members of HM Diplomatic Service
20th-century British diplomats